The 2017 Turkish Basketball Cup was the 32nd edition of Turkey's professional national cup competition for men's basketball teams. The tournament was held in the Ankara Arena in the capital city of Ankara, Turkey.

Bracket

Final

Final MVP  
 Jordan Theodore (Banvit)

See also 
2016–17 Turkish Basketball Super League

References 

Turkish Cup Basketball seasons
Cup